Håkon Ronny Mattsson (born September 10, 1952 in Göteborg) is a Swedish sprint canoer who competed in the mid-1970s. He was eliminated in the semifinals of the K-4 1000 m event at the 1976 Summer Olympics in Montreal.

References
 Sports-Reference.com profile

1952 births
Canoeists at the 1976 Summer Olympics
Living people
Olympic canoeists of Sweden
Swedish male canoeists
Sportspeople from Gothenburg